Kristel Høj Walther (born 11 December 1987) is a Danish Paralympic athlete who competes in discus throw at international level events. She is a European silver medalist at the 2018 World Para Athletics European Championships. In 2008, she had her right leg amputated below the knee after she discovered an aggressive benign tumour in her heel bone.

Walther's great grandfather, Aage Walther was a silver medalist in gymnastics at the 1920 Summer Olympics in Antwerp. Kristel finished ninth at the women's discus throw F46 and is scheduled to compete at the 2020 Summer Paralympics.

References

1987 births
Living people
People from Kerteminde
Sportspeople from Odense
Paralympic athletes of Denmark
Danish female discus throwers
Athletes (track and field) at the 2016 Summer Paralympics
Medalists at the World Para Athletics European Championships
Athletes (track and field) at the 2020 Summer Paralympics